No Business Branch is a stream in the U.S. state of Kentucky.

No Business Branch was so named by moonshiners as a warning to would-be visitors they had "no business" being there.

See also
List of rivers of Kentucky

References

Rivers of Laurel County, Kentucky
Rivers of Kentucky